The heats for the men's 400 metre freestyle race at the 2009 World Championships took place on Sunday, 26 July at the Foro Italico in Rome, Italy.

Records

The following records were established during the competition:

Results

Heats

Legend: ER: European record; NR: National record

Final

Legend: WR: World record; AF: African record; AS: Asian record; NR: National record

References

Freestyle Men 400